The Al-Khansaa Brigade was an all-women police or religious enforcement unit of the jihadist group Islamic State (IS), operating in its de facto capital of Raqqa and Mosul.

History
The brigade was formed in early 2014 and apparently named after Al-Khansa, a female Arabic poet from the earliest days of Islam, it is unclear how widespread and sustained the group is. It was unique in the Muslim world where in other regimes with similar systems of religious police (such as Saudi Arabia) men enforce hisbah among women, and its lack of spread outside of the capital Raqqa, led at least one observer to wonder if it was a publicity "stunt" that would be “short-lived".

An IS official, Abu Ahmad, said in 2014, "We have established the brigade to raise awareness of our religion among women, and to punish women who do not abide by the law." The outfit has also been called IS's 'moral police'.

Women who went out without a male chaperone or were not fully covered in public were subject to arrests and beatings by Al-Khansaa.An example of crimes punished and sentences administered by al-Khansaa were those for two women in Raqqa in 2015, who received 20 lashes for wearing form-fitting abayas, five for wearing makeup underneath their abayas, and another five for "not being meek enough when detained".

The brigade had its own facilities to enforce sex segregation. Its members were aged between 18 and 25, receiving a monthly salary of LS 25,000. According to defectors interviewed by Sky News, al-Khansa Brigade included many foreign women, and recruits were "trained for a month". Their pay is estimated to be "between £70 and £100 [ STG ] per month". Members carried guns and may be fighters (many European women who fight on the front line) or women who "police the streets and look after the city’s affairs" (generally ethnic Arabs). According to one source hostile to IS, women were not allowed to drive cars or carry weapons, but women in the Khansaa Brigade "can do both".

In April 2017 the group released a recruitment video for female hackers claiming to have hacked over 100 social media accounts over the previous month. There have also been reports of infiltration of the group members in Iraqi refugee camps.

See also
 List of armed groups in the Syrian Civil War
 Women in warfare and the military (2000–present)

References

External links
 Al-Khansaa Brigade Manifesto (Translation and analysis by the Quilliam Foundation)

Factions of the Islamic State of Iraq and the Levant
All-female military units and formations
2014 establishments in Syria
Military units and formations established in 2014
Islamic religious police